is a Japanese women's professional shogi player ranked 2-kyū.

Early life and becoming a women's professional shogi player
Kubo was born in Osaka, Japan on January 12, 2006. Since her father Toshiaki is also a shogi professional, she was exposed to the game from an early age. Under the guidance of her father, she entered the Kansai branch of Japan Shogi Association's training group system in October 2019 when she was a first-year junior high school student. She qualified for women's professional status in September 2022 after being promoted to training group B2.

Promotion history
Kubo's promotion history is as follows.

 2-kyū: October 1, 2022

Note: All ranks are women's professional ranks.

References

External links
 ShogiHub: Kubo, Shouko

2006 births
Living people
Japanese shogi players
Women's professional shogi players
Professional shogi players from Osaka Prefecture